Albertson Brook, also called Albertsons Brook, is the name of Nescochague Creek upstream of the confluence with Great Swamp Brook in the southern New Jersey Pine Barrens in the United States.

Albertson Brook is near Hammonton, New Jersey, and flows for  through Atlantic and Camden counties.

It is formed by the confluence of the Pump Branch and Blue Anchor Brook.

Tributaries
Pump Branch
Blue Anchor Brook

See also
List of New Jersey rivers

References

External links
USGS gauging station, Route 206 crossing
National Park Service, National Center for Recreation and Conservation

Rivers of Atlantic County, New Jersey
Rivers of Camden County, New Jersey
Tributaries of the Mullica River
Rivers in the Pine Barrens (New Jersey)
Rivers of New Jersey